Sidney Linear Williams (July 28, 1914 – January 8, 2006) was an American baseball pitcher in the Negro leagues. He played with the Newark Eagles in 1945 and the New York Black Yankees in 1946.

References

External links
 and Seamheads 

Newark Eagles players
New York Black Yankees players
1914 births
2006 deaths
Baseball players from Georgia (U.S. state)
Baseball pitchers